First Things First may refer to:

First Things First (album), by Bob Bennett
First Things First (1994 book), a self-help book by Stephen Covey and A. Roger and Rebecca R. Merrill
First Things First (2019 book), a free speech textbook by Ronald K.L. Collins, Will Creeley, and David L. Hudson Jr.
First Things First 1964 manifesto, a statement concerning graphic design
First Things First 2000 manifesto, an updated version of the above
First Things First Foundation, a U.S. Christian organization
"First Things First", a 1956 poem by W. H. Auden, which closes with the oft-quoted line "Thousands have lived without love, not one without water."
"First Things First", a song by Neon Trees on their album Pop Psychology
First Things First (TV series), a talk show on FS1.